"Na tvojim rukama" (English translation: In your arms) is a pop song by the Croatian singer Franka Batelić, recorded for the Croatian selection for the Eurovision Song Contest 2010. It finished the 8th with a total of 18 points won.

HRT Dora 2010 
With "Na tvojim rukama" Franka Batelić will take part in the Croatian selection for the Eurovision Song Contest 2010, and is qualified directly to the final on 6 March. The final event of Dora 2010 was held on 6 March 2010, and sixteen contestants took part in; Batelić performed the twelfth. Her songs received only nine points from the jury and 12 points from the votes, and finished the 7th with a total of 21 points.

See also 
 Croatia in the Eurovision Song Contest
 Croatia in the Eurovision Song Contest 2010
 HRT Dora

References

External links 
 Official Studio Version at YouTube

2010 singles
Franka Batelić songs
2010 songs
Songs written by Bora Đorđević